Arnold Robert McGill OAM (1905–1988) was a Sydney-based Australian businessman and amateur ornithologist.  He was President of the Royal Australasian Ornithologists Union (RAOU) 1958–1959, and elected a Fellow of the RAOU in 1965.  He was Assistant Editor of the RAOU journal, the Emu 1948-1969 and compiled indexes to it until his death.  He coauthored, with Keith Hindwood, The Birds of Sydney (1958).  He was a recipient of the Medal of the Order of Australia.

Further reading
 Arnold Robert McGill, Australian Dictionary of Biography

References
Robin, Libby. (2001). The Flight of the Emu: a hundred years of Australian ornithology 1901-2001. Carlton, Vic. Melbourne University Press. 

1905 births
1988 deaths
Australian ornithologists
Recipients of the Medal of the Order of Australia
20th-century Australian zoologists
Scientists from Sydney